Uyirmei is a Tamil medical soap opera that aired on Zee Thamizh. The series is apparently inspired by Grey's Anatomy and House. The plot revolves around the lives of some doctors, their lives, families and patients. The show premiered on 18 August 2014.First the director was Bhushan but after a couple of episodes Sundhar.K.Vijayan started to direct. Starting from Monday 24 November 2014, the show was shifted to 7pm time Slot. Its episodes ended on 30 January 2015 with 112 episodes.

Plot
Dr Dayananad, founder of Dayanand medical foundation, gives the power of attorney to Kavitha (Amala) but after some hours Dayanand falls ill. Kavitha  manages the situation but problem ensues when the sons and daughters of Dayanand comes and irritates to give the power of attorney to them. To irritate her,the sons take Dayanand to Singapore Hospital. After a long fight, a shocking news arrives to them that Dayanand has died. The rest of the story follows how Kavitha struggles to maintain the hospital and safeguard from the sons of Dayanand.

Cast
 Amala as Dr. Kavitha Sandeep, Head of Emergency Care 
 Srithika as Dr. Bhuvana Natrajan, a Junior Consultant in Internal Medicine
 Vineeth as Tamilselvan, a surgical intern
 Praveen as Doctor Mano Arunmani, a Junior Consultant in General Surgery
 Gibran Osman as Dr. Karan Bhalla, a pediatrician
 Harsitha as Jenny, a nurse
 Bharat Kalyan as Sandeep, Kavitha's husband
 Revathy Shankar as Sandeep's Mother
 Pooja Lokesh as Pooja, Sandeep's Ex Girlfriend
 Chandra Mohan
 Vatsala Rajagopal
 Reshma Pasupuleti as Sumathi

Production 
The series was created by director Bhushan Kalyan who had earlier apprenticed under acclaimed filmmaker Mani Ratnam in films such as Iruvar (1997). Kalyan's wife and director V. Priya, who has also assisted Ratnam, serves as the creative director. Actor and entrepreneur Gibran Osman was roped in to play a pediatrician, a character which is likeable and an instant hit with his patients. First the director was Bhushan but after a couple of episodes Sundhar.K.Vijayan started to direct. Even Gibran was removed.

Principal photography began in July 2014 in Chennai. The shooting was held at Ambattur where a sprawling set of an hospital was erected by art director and production designer Thota Tharani. The first episode was aired on 18 August 2014 in the satellite channel Zee Thamizh.

Airing history 
The show started airing on Zee Thamizh on 18 August 2014 and It aired on Monday through Friday 8:00PM IST. Later its timing changed Starting from Monday 24 November 2014, the show was shifted to 7:00PM time Slot.

References

External links
 

Zee Tamil original programming
Tamil-language medical television series
Tamil-language romance television series
2014 Tamil-language television series debuts
Tamil-language television shows
2015 Tamil-language television series endings
Television shows set in Tamil Nadu